Verkh is a rural locality (a village) in Korotovskoye Rural Settlement, Cherepovetsky District, Vologda Oblast, Russia. The population was 47 as of 2002. There are 4 streets.

Geography 
Verkh is located 65 km southwest of Cherepovets (the district's administrative centre) by road. Korotkovo is the nearest rural locality.

References 

Rural localities in Cherepovetsky District